Shelby Steven McEntire Blackstock (born February 23, 1990) is an American race car driver. He is the son of country music singer Reba McEntire and her ex-husband Narvel Blackstock. His older half-brother, Brandon Blackstock, was formerly married to singer Kelly Clarkson. He also has two older half-sisters, Shawna and Chassidy.

Racing career
Blackstock began his racing career in college when he went to a Bob Bondurant race school. He dropped out of college and decided to pursue a racing career full-time. His first significant appearances were in Skip Barber competition in 2010 and 2011. In 2011 he made his professional debut driving a Ford Mustang in the Continental Tire Sports Car Challenge. He also finished fifth in the 2011 Skip Barber National Championship. In 2012, he moved to the U.S. F2000 National Championship with Andretti Autosport. He finished eighth in points with a best finish of fourth at Road America. He moved up with Andretti Autosport to the Pro Mazda Championship in 2013, finishing third in points and capturing a win at Canadian Tire Motorsports Park among six podium finishes in 16 races. In 2014 he continued in Pro Mazda with Andretti, but fell to fourth in points, but still captured six podium finishes, but not a race victory.

In 2015 Blackstock signed to race for Andretti Autosport in the Indy Lights series. Blackstock made 50 Indy Lights starts for Andretti Autosport and Belardi Auto Racing over the next three seasons, finishing on the podium twice, both at the Mid-Ohio Sports Car Course, and had a best points finish of 8th in 2016. While he may have only had two podiums over that time, he was also consistent, registering only two DNF's. Blackstock participated in the season-opening weekend of the 2018 Indy Lights season with Team Pelfrey and finished second in the second race, his career best Indy Lights finish. However, that would be his last Indy Lights race.

In 2019 Blackstock moved to touring car racing participating in the IMSA Michelin Pilot Challenge where he finished 4th in points in the TCR class in a Honda Civic. In 2020 he is competing in the GT World Challenge America in a Acura NSX. He and co-driver Trent Hindman won the series' Silver Cup for professional drivers by default as they were the only class entry to compete in every race.

American open-wheel racing results 

(key)

U.S. F2000 National Championship

Pro Mazda Championship

Indy Lights

* Season still in progress

References

External links

1990 births
GT World Challenge America drivers
Indy Pro 2000 Championship drivers
Indy Lights drivers
Living people
Racing drivers from Tennessee
Sportspeople from Nashville, Tennessee
Toyota Racing Series drivers
U.S. F2000 National Championship drivers
Belardi Auto Racing drivers
Andretti Autosport drivers
Team Pelfrey drivers
Nürburgring 24 Hours drivers
Michelin Pilot Challenge drivers